PCIC or pcic may refer to:

The Pcič, a river in Eastern Europe
Philippine Central Islands College, a college in San Jose, Occidental Mindoro, Philippines
Philippine Crop Insurance Corporation, an agency attached to the Philippines Department of Finance
Petrovietnam Construction Investment Consultant Joint Stock Company, a company controlled by Petrovietnam
Parkdale Community Information Centre, a public service agency in Parkdale, Toronto, Canada
Police-Citizen Interaction Committee, associated with the Rochester Police Department of Rochester, New York, United States
President Candidate Image Checklist, developed by South Korean psychologist Sang-Min Whang
Henley Professional Certificate in Coaching, of the Henley Business School, Africa, in Johannesburg, South Africa